The 2016 Shimadzu All Japan Indoor Tennis Championships was a professional tennis tournament played on carpet. It was the 20th edition of the tournament which was part of the 2016 ATP Challenger Tour. It took place in Kyoto, Japan between 22 and 28 February.

ATP singles main draw entrants

Seeds

 1 Rankings are as of February 15, 2016.

Other entrants
The following players received wildcards into the singles main draw:
  Sora Fukuda
  Shintaro Imai
  Ken Onishi
  Yasutaka Uchiyama

The following players received entry from the qualifying draw:
  Andriej Kapaś
  Yuya Kibi
  Luke Saville
  Shuichi Sekiguchi

Champions

Singles

  Yūichi Sugita def.  Zhang Ze 5–7, 6–3, 6–4

Doubles

  Gong Maoxin /  Yi Chu-huan def.  Go Soeda /  Yasutaka Uchiyama 6–3, 7–6(9–7)

External links
 Combined Main Draw

Shimadzu All Japan Indoor Tennis Championships
All Japan Indoor Tennis Championships
Shimadzu All Japan Indoor Tennis Championships